The 1967 Tulane Green Wave football team was an American football team that represented Tulane University during the 1967 NCAA University Division football season as an independent. In their second year under head coach Jim Pittman, the team compiled a 3–7 record.

Schedule

References

Tulane
Tulane Green Wave football seasons
Tulane Green Wave football